Absolom is a Belgian dance music group.

Absolom may also refer to:

Absolom (name)
Absolom motorcycles, Australian motorcycle manufacturer